Women's field hockey at the 2006 Commonwealth Games took place between 16 March and 25 March. The competition consisted of a round robin stage of two groups of five with the winners and runners-up of each group qualifying for the semifinals. All matches were played at the State Netball and Hockey Centre in the Parkville area of Melbourne.

The Gold medal was won by Australia, who defeated 2002 champions India 1 – 0 in the final. England won the bronze medal by defeating New Zealand 3 – 1 on penalty strokes.

Squads

Results

Preliminary round

Pool A

Pool B

Classification round

Fifth to tenth place classification

Ninth and tenth place

Seventh and eighth place

Fifth and sixth place

First to fourth place classification

Semi-finals

Bronze-medal match

Gold-medal match

Statistics

Final standings

Goalscorers

References

2006
Women's tournament
Com
International women's field hockey competitions hosted by Australia